Inspector Hornleigh Goes To It is a 1941 British detective film directed by Walter Forde and starring Gordon Harker, Alastair Sim, Phyllis Calvert and Edward Chapman. It was the third and final film adaptation of the Inspector Hornleigh stories.

It was released in America by 20th-Century Fox under the title Mail Train.

Plot summary 
Hornleigh and Sergeant Bingham join the army in an effort to uncover a ring of German spies.

Cast 
 Gordon Harker as Inspector Hornleigh
 Alastair Sim as Sergeant Bingham
 Phyllis Calvert as Mrs. Wilkinson
 Edward Chapman as Mr. Blenkinsop 
 Charles Oliver as Dr. Wilkinson 
 Raymond Huntley as Dr. Kerbishley
 Percy Walsh as Inspector Blow
 David Horne as Commissioner 
 Peter Gawthorne as Colonel
 Wally Patch as Sergeant Major
 Betty Jardine as Daisy
 O. B. Clarence as Professor Mackenzie
 John Salew as Mr. Tomboy
 Cyril Cusack as Postal Sorter
 Bill Shine as Hotel Porter
 Sylvia Cecil
 Edward Underdown
 Marie Makine
 Richard Cooper

Soundtrack 
 "The Beer Barrel Polka" (written by Lew Brown, Wladimir A. Timm, Jaromir Vejvoda & Vasek Zeman)
 "Jungle Lullaby" (written by Art Noel, Don Pelosi and John Rivers)

References

External links 
 

1941 films
1941 crime drama films
British black-and-white films
British detective films
Films directed by Walter Forde
British crime drama films
20th Century Fox films
Films set in London
1940s English-language films
1940s British films